The following lists events that happened during 2000 in Australia.

Incumbents

Monarch – Elizabeth II
Governor-General – Sir William Deane
Prime Minister – John Howard
Deputy Prime Minister – John Anderson
Opposition Leader – Kim Beazley
Chief Justice – Murray Gleeson

State and Territory Leaders
Premier of New South Wales – Bob Carr
Opposition Leader – Kerry Chikarovski
Premier of Queensland – Peter Beattie
Opposition Leader – Rob Borbidge
Premier of South Australia – John Olsen
Opposition Leader – Mike Rann
Premier of Tasmania – Jim Bacon
Opposition Leader – Sue Napier
Premier of Victoria – Steve Bracks
Opposition Leader – Denis Napthine
Premier of Western Australia – Richard Court
Opposition Leader – Geoff Gallop
Chief Minister of the Australian Capital Territory – Kate Carnell (until 18 October), then Gary Humphries
Opposition Leader – Jon Stanhope
Chief Minister of the Northern Territory – Denis Burke
Opposition Leader – Clare Martin
Chief Minister of Norfolk Island – George Smith (until 28 February), then Ronald Nobbs

Governors and Administrators
Governor of New South Wales – Gordon Samuels
Governor of Queensland – Peter Arnison
Governor of South Australia – Sir Eric Neal
Governor of Tasmania – Sir Guy Green
Governor of Victoria – Sir James Gobbo (until 31 December)
Governor of Western Australia – Michael Jeffery (until 18 August), then John Sanderson
Administrator of the Australian Indian Ocean Territories – Bill Taylor
Administrator of Norfolk Island – Tony Messner
Administrator of the Northern Territory – Neil Conn (until 28 November), then John Anictomatis

2000 is to date the last time in which no Federal, State or Territory elections were held and the first time that no general election was held for any house of Parliament since 1942.

Events

January
1 January
Serbian President Slobodan Milosevic releases Care Australia worker Branko Jeken from imprisonment in Serbia.
The National Archives releases 1969 Cabinet documents.
Pakistani cricketer Shoaib Akhtar returns home to Pakistan after the ICC rules that his bowling action during a recent match was illegal.
2 January – A massive oil spill occurs off the coast of Phillip Island, endangering the region's penguin population.
3 January – When Federal Justice Minister, Senator Amanda Vanstone is asked whether alleged Nazi war criminal Konrad Kalejs would be welcome when he arrived in Australia in the coming days, she replies, "Would you expect a situation where any Australian citizen would not be?", an answer which caused much controversy.
7 January – Alleged Nazi war criminal Konrad Kalejs returns to Australia, arriving at Tullamarine Airport, Melbourne, and met by a barrage of protesters.
8 January – Queensland Labor Member for Woodridge, Bill D'Arcy resigns from Queensland Parliament due to the controversy caused by the Net Bet scandal.
10 January – CASA issues an Airworthiness Directive which grounds all aircraft after being advised the day before that more contaminants had been found in fuel produced at Mobil's Altona refinery in Melbourne.
11 January
Australia's biggest ecstasy haul is discovered in Brisbane and seven are arrested.
Another 83 asylum seekers arrive in Darwin
Australian troops return home from East Timor
A commuter train derails in Hornsby, Sydney.
12 January – Leonard Fraser is committed to stand trial over the murder of Rockhampton schoolgirl Keyra Steinhardt.
21 January – Former Queensland Labor MP, Bill D'Arcy, is named as the political figure facing child-sex charges.  He is committed to the District Court on 49 charges relating to his career as a school teacher.

February
5 February 
The Woodridge state by-election and Bundamba state by-election are held in Queensland.  Labor MP Mike Kaiser wins the seat of Woodridge.
Cyclist Peter Cribb is attacked by a gang of up to ten thugs on the Brisbane Riverside Bikeway and suffers severe brain damage as a result, prompting a widespread ongoing police crackdown on gang violence.
9 February – A 15–year–old Aboriginal boy, who was imprisoned for 28 days for stealing stationery, commits suicide in a Northern Territory prison, sparking controversy about the mandatory sentencing laws of the Territory and neighboring Western Australia.
16 February – 21–year–old Jamie Wurramara, who stole $23 worth of biscuits on Christmas Day 1999, is sentenced to a year in jail under the Northern Territory's mandatory sentencing laws, prompting a wave of protests around the nation.
25 February – The Federal Opposition calls on Aged Care Minister Bronwyn Bishop to resign after revelations she waited four weeks to act on reports that elderly residents of the Riverside Nursing Home were given kerosene baths in an effort to rid them of scabies, a skin rash.
29 February – Katherine Knight murders her partner John Price by stabbing him 37 times in Aberdeen, New South Wales. She proceeded to decapitate, skin and cook the victim in a crime that shocked the country.

March
16 March – A nationwide recall of Herron headache tablets is ordered after a Brisbane doctor and his 18–year–old son are hospitalised with strychnine poisoning.
18 March – Herron offers a $250,000 reward to try to find out who tampered with its paracetamol products. A 32–year–old Brisbane man is subsequently arrested.
20 March – Queensland Premier Peter Beattie announces that State Cabinet has approved a $30 million deal to exclude trawling from 35 percent of the Great Barrier Reef Marine Park and reduce the fish catch from the reef by 15 percent.
25 March – Brisbane City Council election - Jim Soorley is elected for a fourth term as Lord Mayor of Brisbane, defeating Liberal candidate Gail Austen.

April
6 April – Train carriages derail at Redfern, Sydney.  No passengers are involved.
10 April – Prime Minister John Howard reaches agreement with the Northern Territory Chief Minister Denis Burke on mandatory sentencing. In exchange for Commonwealth funding, the Territory's laws will be changed to give diversionary programmes as a substitute for jail time to children accused of minor crimes. Police will have discretion to give children who've committed more serious crimes access to these programmes.
27 April – Four elderly people, between the ages of 65 to 88, are hospitalised after catching the potentially fatal Legionnaire's disease at the new Melbourne Aquarium in what became Victoria's worst outbreak of the disease with possible exposure to up to 10,000 people.

May
21 May – The Airport Rail Link opens in Sydney.
28 May – 250,000 people walk across the Sydney Harbour Bridge in support of reconciliation with Australia's Aboriginal people.

June
23 June – The Childers backpacker hostel fire kills 15 people.

July
1 July – Goods and Services Tax introduced.
24 July – Five people are killed in the 2000 Marlborough helicopter crash when a rescue helicopter crashes while attempting to land in thick fog at Marlborough, Queensland.

August
10 August – Beginning of the Sydney gang rapes by a group from up to fourteen men.
15 August – Queensland Attorney–General Matt Foley announces that the Government has ordered an independent investigation into allegations of widespread electoral rorting within the Queensland Labor Party.
17 August – It is announced that the current Queensland Assistant Police Commissioner Bob Atkinson will replace Jim O'Sullivan as Police Commissioner when he retires on 31 October.

September
11–13 September – The World Economic Forum is held in Melbourne. The S11 movement organises protests that overshadow the meeting.
15 September – 1 October – Sydney Olympics held & are a massive success. Outgoing International Olympic Committee president Juan Antonio Samaranch regards them as the 'best Olympic Games ever'. The Olympic Games are handed back to their birthplace Athens, Greece from Sydney, Australia. They'll are welcome back home, soon in the next 4 years to host 2004 Summer Olympics

October
10 October – It is revealed that Workplace Relations Minister Peter Reith has incurred almost $50,000 on a taxpayer-funded Telecard for a service he says he hasn't used for years, but which he admits he gave to his son.

November
1 November – Former Queensland Labor MP Bill D'Arcy is found guilty of 18 child sex charges committed while he was a school teacher.
November – New South Wales suffers its worst floods in 40 years, with 240 cm of rain falling in one week.
22 November – Jim Elder resigns as Queensland Deputy Premier, citing allegations of electoral rorting within the Labor Party currently under investigation by the Shepherdson Inquiry.

Arts and literature
 ARIA Music Awards of 2000
 Thea Astley's novel Drylands and Kim Scott's novel Benang are co-winners of the Miles Franklin Award

Film
 27 June – Star Wars: Episode II – Attack of the Clones begins principal photography at Fox Studios Australia in Sydney.
 2 October – Queen of the Damned, based on the novel by Anne Rice, begins principal photography in a converted biscuit factory in St Albans, Melbourne.
 The Dish
 Looking for Alibrandi
 The Wog Boy

Television
1 January – The Seven Network introduces a new logo to celebrate the 2000 Sydney Olympics, the first one not to have the 7 inside a circle.
February – Popstars becomes the first Australian reality talent show, earns massive ratings for the Seven Network & leads to Bardot, the end product of the show, becoming the first Australian act to debut at no.1 on the ARIA charts,
September – The Sydney Olympics earn record ratings for Channel 7 with the Olympic Opening & Closing Ceremonies & its continuous coverage.

Sport
 1 January – Carlton defeats Collingwood in a Millennium special pre–season match
11 January – NRL announces strict penalties for clubs found guilty of breaching salary caps
14 January – Tennis – Mark Philippousis defeats Pete Sampras to win the Colonial Classic Final
Grant Hackett wins 800 metres at the Queensland swimming titles.
24 February – First day of the Australian Track & Field Championships for the 1999–2000 season, which are held at the Stadium Australia in Sydney. The 10,000 metres was conducted at the Melbourne Grand Prix on 2 March 2000.
9 March – Colonial Stadium (now Telstra Dome) plays host to its first game of Australian rules football. Essendon defeats Port Adelaide (24.12.156) to (8.14.62)
27 April – In the 2000 Anzac Test Australia defeat New Zealand 52 - 0 at Sydney's Stadium Australia before a crowd of 26,023
3 May – Anthony Mundine, after going AWOL from the St George Illawarra Dragons for 10 days, announces his retirement from rugby league and switches to boxing.
5 June, Suncorp Stadium – The 2000 State of Origin series is wrapped up by New South Wales in game two of the series against Queensland.
11 June – Wollongong Wolves come from 3–0 behind at half-time to defeat Perth Glory and win the NSL Grand Final on penalties after the game finished 3–3. The attendance at Subiaco Oval was 43,242, the record attendance in Australian domestic football history until broken in 2006.
15 July – Essendon becomes the first VFL/AFL team to begin a season with nineteen consecutive wins, beating Collingwood's record from 1929.
2 August – Essendon becomes the first team to finish with a 21–1 record; a feat subsequently equalled by Geelong in 2008.
11 August – The Melbourne Phoenix defeat the Adelaide Thunderbirds 52–51 in the Commonwealth Bank Trophy netball grand final.
27 August – Minor premiers the Brisbane Broncos defeat the Sydney Roosters 14–6 at Stadium Australia (now Telstra Stadium) to win the 93rd NSWRL/ARL/NRL premiership. It is the fifth premiership for the Broncos and the last grand final played during the day. The North Queensland Cowboys finish in last position, claiming the wooden spoon.
2 September – Essendon (19.21.135) defeats Melbourne (11.9.75) to win the 104th VFL/AFL premiership. It is the last occasion until 2010 that the grand final has been an all-Melbourne affair and the last occasion until 2008 that the grand final has been an all-Victorian affair.
7 November – Horse Brew wins the Melbourne Cup.
19 November – Garth Tander and Jason Bargwanna win the FAI Bathurst 1000 for Garry Rogers Motorsport, a first for the team and both drivers.
2000 Summer Olympics in Sydney, Australia result in a record 58 medals for Australia.
2000 Anzac Test

Births
 12 January – Chelsie Dawber, footballer
 16 January – Abigail Paduch, judoka
 31 January – Princess Ibini-Isei, football forward
 6 February – Erin Cleaver, track and field para athlete
 25 February – David Fifita, rugby league player
 30 March – Riley Day, sprinter
 28 April – Ellie Carpenter, footballer
 4 May – Nicholas Hamilton, actor
 15 May – Jacob Bragg, runner
 16 May – MelindaJ Barbieri, football midfielder
 1 July – Emily Hodgson, footballer
 13 July – Ella Connolly, sprinter
 15 July – Jarrod Freeman, cricketer
 2 November – Tess Coady, snowboarder
 11 November – Aretha Brown, Indigenous youth activist
 16 November – Josh Green, basketball player
 7 December – Bailey Smith, footballer
 11 December – Emily Whitehead, artistic gymnast

Deaths
 1 January – Colin Vaughan, 68, Australian-Canadian journalist and activist (b. 1931)
 5 March – Dame Roma Mitchell, 86, Governor of South Australia (b. 1913)
 27 March – Sue Wah Chin, 98, entrepreneur (b. 1900)
 30 March – Michael Pitman, 67, biologist
 2 April – Bunney Brooke, 80, actor
 10 April –  Mary MacLean Hindmarsh, 78, botanist
 21 May – Dulcie Holland, 87, composer and music educator
 1 June – Sir Raymond Ferrall, 94, businessman, author and cricketer
 19 June – Ron Casey, 72, Australian rules footballer and television commentator
 3 July – Vivian Bullwinkel, 84, army nurse
 14 July – Mark Oliphant, 98, physicist
 14 June – Greg Wilton, 44, ALP politician, only serving member of the House of Representatives to have committed suicide
 7 September – Bruce Gyngell, 71, television personality
 19 October – Charles Perkins, 64, Aboriginal activist
 1 December – Doug Waterhouse, 84, entomologist
 26 December – John McLeay, 78, Liberal politician

See also
 2000 in Australian literature
 2000 in Australian television
 List of Australian films of 2000

References

 
Australia
Years of the 20th century in Australia
Australia
2000s in Australia